This is a list of seasons completed by the Georgia Tech Yellow Jackets men's college basketball team.

Seasons

References

 
Georgia Tech Yellow Jackets
Georgia Tech Yellow Jackets basketball seasons